Richard D. McKirahan Jr. is an American philosopher and Edwin Clarence Norton Professor of Classics and Professor of Philosophy at Pomona College in Claremont, California. He is known for his works on Pre-Socratics.

Early life and education 
McKirahan attended the University of California, Berkeley and the University of Oxford as a Marshall Scholar before completing his doctorate at Harvard University.

Career 
McKirahan began teaching at Pomona in 1987. He is the president of the Society for Ancient Greek Philosophy, a position he has held since 2012.

Books

References

20th-century American philosophers
21st-century American philosophers
Philosophy academics
Living people
Place of birth missing (living people)
Pomona College faculty
American scholars of ancient Greek philosophy
Year of birth missing (living people)
University of California, Berkeley alumni
Harvard University alumni
Marshall Scholars